Motiur Rahman Nizami (31 March 1943 – 11 May 2016) was a politician, former Minister of Bangladesh, Islamic scholar, writer, and the former leader of the Bangladesh Jamaat-e-Islami. He is noted for leading the terror squad Al-Badr during the Bangladesh Liberation War. On 29 October 2014, he was convicted of masterminding the Demra massacre by the International Crimes Tribunal of Bangladesh. Nizami was the Member of Parliament for the Pabna-1 constituency from 1991 to 1996 and again from 2001 to 2006. He also served as the Bangladeshi Minister of Agriculture and Minister of Industry.

While various political entities and international organizations had originally welcomed the trials, in November 2011 Human Rights Watch criticized the government for aspects of their progress, lack of transparency, and reported harassment of defense lawyers and witnesses representing the accused. Nizami was the last high-profile suspect to be tried for war crimes of the 1971 Bangladesh Genocide; the court delayed his verdict in June 2014 because of the state of his health.

In 2004, Nizami was convicted under separate charges for arms trafficking to the state of Assam, India and was sentenced to death, along with 13 other men in January 2014.

On 29 October 2014, he was convicted and sentenced to death for his role in masterminding the Demra massacre, in which 800–900 unarmed Hindu civilians were killed after the women were raped. He was executed by hanging at Dhaka Central Jail on 11 May 2016. He is the third minister of Bangladesh to be hanged. He was frequently listed on The 500 Most Influential Muslims.

Early life and education
Nizami was born on 31 March 1943 in the village of Monmothpur of Santhia Upazila at Pabna. His father was Lutfur Rahman Khan. He completed his secondary education at a madrasa. In 1963, he received his Kamil degree in Islamic jurisprudence from Madrasa-e-Alia in Dhaka. He earned his bachelor's from the University of Dhaka in 1967.

Political career
Nizami rose in the ranks of the East Pakistan branch of Jamaat-e-Islami Pakistan in the 1960s, having led the student organization, Islamic Chhatro Shango (now Islami Chhatro Shibir). After the independence of Bangladesh, Sheikh Mujibur Rahman, the first president, banned Jamaat from political participation as it had opposed the liberation war, and many of its members collaborated with the Pakistan Army during the conflict. Nizami and some other top leaders left the country.

After the assassination by military officers of Sheikh Mujibur Rahman in August 1975, Ziaur Rahman became president in a coup in 1977. He permitted top Jamaat leaders, such as Ghulam Azam and Nizami,  to return to Bangladesh in 1978; they revived the Jamaat party, which became the largest Islamist party in the country. Nizami emerged as a key leader of the Jamaat, organising the Islami Chhatra Shibir (Jammat Students Organisation), which serves as the youth wing of the Jamaat.

In 1991, he was elected as a Member of Parliament, representing Jamaat-e-Islami for the constituency of Pabna-1; he was Jamaat's Parliamentary Party leader until 1994. During the 1996 elections, he lost to the candidates of both the Bangladesh Nationalist Party (BNP), an ally of Jamaat, and the Awami League in his constituency. Professor Abu Sayed of the Awami League gained his seat.

In 1971, Nizami was a chief of the infamous Al-Badr militia. Along with the Pakistan Army, this militia abducted and massacred 989 Bengali intellectuals including professors, journalists, litterateurs, doctors and pro-Bangladesh activists in general.

Leader of Jamaat-e-Islami
Nizami took over as the leader of Jamaat from Ghulam Azam in 2001. In the same year, representing his party as part of a four-party alliance including BNP, Nizami won a seat in Parliament in Pabna-1, receiving 57.68% of the votes. From 2001 to 2003, he served as the Minister of Agriculture, then as the Minister of Industry from 2003 to 2006.

Nizami was defeated in the December 2008 general election as a candidate of the Four-Party Alliance, losing his seat for Pabna-1 to Md. Shamsul Haque of the Awami League. Nizami received 45.6% of the votes. The Awami League took two-thirds of the seats in Parliament.

Controversies

Allegations of corruption
In May 2008, the Anti-corruption Commission of Bangladesh indicted Nizami in the GATCO Corruption case, in which he along with several other politicians were alleged to have illegally granted a container-depot contract to the local firm GATCO. A warrant was issued to arrest Nizami along with 12 others on 15 May 2008.

Nizami was charged with conspiring with 12 other politicians to award the contract to GATCO although the company did not meet the conditions of the tender. The prosecution alleged that the deal with GATCO caused a total loss of more than 100 million Bangladeshi Taka to the Government. Nizami denied the charges and said they were politically motivated. He was released after two months on bail.

Blasphemy charges
In a public speech on 17 March 2010, the Dhaka Jamaat chief, Rafiqul Islam, compared Nizami's life to that of the Islamic prophet Muhammad, persisting in the face of persecution. On 21 March, the Bangladesh Tariqat Federation sued Rafiqul, Nizami and other Jamaat members "for hurting Islamic sentiments of the masses by comparing Nizami with the Prophet".

Nizami, along with three other senior Jamaat leaders, was arrested on charges on 29 March 2010. He secured bail the next day and appealed for dismissal of the case on 14 February 2011. The High Court adjourned the case for four months in March 2011.

Smuggling charges
On 4 May 2011, Nizami was arrested on allegations of smuggling arms to Assamese insurgents in India in 2004. His bail petition on 7 September 2011 was denied.

On 30 January 2014, Nizami and 13 co-conspirators were sentenced to death by hanging after being found guilty of smuggling arms.

International Crimes Tribunal

In 2009, the Awami League-led Bangladesh government established a tribunal in Bangladesh to investigate those suspected of committing atrocities during Bangladesh Liberation War in 1971. Nizami and eight other leaders of Jamaat-e-Islami were charged with war crimes by the prosecution, as were two leaders of the Bangladesh National Party. Opposition parties and human rights groups alleged political interference in the trial, given that all the accused were leading opposition politicians. Nizami was the last high-profile suspect to be tried for 1971 war crimes; the court delayed his verdict in June 2014 because of the state of his health. On 29 October 2014, it was announced that Nizami had been sentenced to death for war crimes committed during the 1971 independence war against Pakistan.

Death
On 11 May 2016, Nizami was hanged at Dhaka Central Jail, just days after the nation's highest court dismissed his final appeal to overturn the death sentence for atrocities committed during the country's 1971 war. He was hanged just before midnight (1800 GMT) after he refused to seek mercy from the President of Bangladesh. He was executed between 11:50 pm and 12:01 am midnight. He was buried at his family’s home in northern Bangladesh.

Reaction 
:Pakistan's foreign office said in statement that "Pakistan is deeply saddened over the hanging of the emir of Jamaat-i-Islami Bangladesh, Mr Motiur Rahman Nizami, for the alleged crimes committed before December 1971.

:Turkey condemned execution of Motiur Rahman Nizami and withdrew Turkish Ambassador from Bangladesh.

See also
 Abul A'la Maududi

References

External links
 "Martyred Intellectuals: Murdered History: Raising Hopes Only to be Betrayed", New Age, 15 December 2005
 AsiaMedia report, University of California Los Angeles

1943 births
2016 deaths
Bangladesh Liberation War
Bangladesh Jamaat-e-Islami politicians
Bangladeshi people convicted of war crimes
Executed Bangladeshi people
21st-century executions by Bangladesh
People from Pabna District
People executed by Bangladesh by hanging
People executed for war crimes
8th Jatiya Sangsad members
Industries ministers of Bangladesh
Agriculture ministers of Bangladesh
5th Jatiya Sangsad members
University of Dhaka alumni
Executed politicians
Government Madrasah-e-Alia alumni
1971 Bangladesh genocide perpetrators
Executed mass murderers